The 1872 Caversham by-election was a by-election held on 28 August 1872 in the  electorate in the Otago region of New Zealand during the 5th New Zealand Parliament.

The by-election was caused by the resignation of the incumbent Richard Cantrell, on 31 July 1872.

The by-election was won by William Tolmie. His opponent William Cutten had also stood in the 1870 Caversham by-election. James Crowe Richmond was nominated but withdrew before the election; he received one vote.

Results

There were five polling booths. Tolmie won at four of them, and Cutten had a majority at the Andersons Bay booth.

References 

 

Caversham 1872
1872 elections in New Zealand
April 1872 events
Politics of Otago